Tian Yuanyuan (born 3 July 1992) is a track and road cyclist from China. She represented her nation at the 2015 UCI Track Cycling World Championships. She is from Sichuan.

Major results
2014
2nd Omnium, China Track Cup
2nd Omnium, Hong Kong International Track Cup
3rd Team Pursuit, Hong Kong International Track Cup (with Feng Chu, Li Ying Tong and Yang Zhaochun)
2015
1st Omnium, China Track Cup
2017
2nd Team Pursuit, National Track Championships (with Chen Qiaolin, Liu Dexiang and Liu Jiali)

References

External links
 profile at Procyclingstats.com

1992 births
Chinese female cyclists
Living people
Place of birth missing (living people)
21st-century Chinese women